Orenia metallireducens is a halophilic and metal-reducing bacterium from the genus of Orenia which has been isolated from groundwater from the Illinois Basin.

References

Clostridia
Bacteria described in 2016